Yantai Shimao No. 1 The Harbour ( or ) is a  62-story supertall skyscraper under construction in the city of Yantai, Shandong, China. Its foundation was laid on 9 July 2007. Construction started in 2008 and is slated to finish in 2015. There are three other towers part of the project completed in 2011 and built in the same plot, ranging from 54 to 59 stories high and 175 to 190 meters.

Though promoted as the "tallest building in Shandong", its planned height was surpassed by other buildings in the province before construction was completed.

References

External links
Shimao Group
Shimao Property

Buildings and structures in Shandong
Buildings and structures under construction in China